Urbana Township is one of the twelve townships of Champaign County, Ohio, United States. The 2010 census reported 14,795 people living in the township, 3,159 of whom lived in the unincorporated portions of the township.

Geography
Located in the southern part of the county, it borders the following townships:
Salem Township - north
Union Township - east
Moorefield Township, Clark County - south
German Township, Clark County - southwest corner
Mad River Township - west
Concord Township - northwest corner

Most of the city of Urbana, the county seat of Champaign County, is located in northern Urbana Township.

Name and history
Urbana Township was established in the 1810s. It is the only Urbana Township statewide.

Government
The township is governed by a three-member board of trustees, who are elected in November of odd-numbered years to a four-year term beginning on the following January 1. Two are elected in the year after the presidential election and one is elected in the year before it. There is also an elected township fiscal officer, who serves a four-year term beginning on April 1 of the year after the election, which is held in November of the year before the presidential election. Vacancies in the fiscal officership or on the board of trustees are filled by the remaining trustees.

References

External links
County website
County and township map of Ohio

Townships in Champaign County, Ohio
Townships in Ohio